Battle of Los Angeles (2012) was the eighth Battle of Los Angeles professional wrestling tournament produced by Pro Wrestling Guerrilla (PWG). It was a two-night event which took place on September 1 and September 2, 2012 at the American Legion Post #308 in Reseda, Los Angeles, California.

It was a sixteen-man tournament which concluded with Adam Cole defeating Michael Elgin in the final. Aside from the tournament, two six-man tag team matches took place on the second night. The first match pitted the losers of the first round as B-Boy, Drake Younger and Willie Mack defeated Team Statutory (Davey Richards, Joey Ryan and Kyle O'Reilly) and the team of World Champion Kevin Steen, El Generico and referee Rick Knox defeated Brian Cage and The Young Bucks (Matt Jackson and Nick Jackson).

Background
Initially, on July 22, the tournament was announced as taking place in one night on September 1 with twelve participants, however, the following day it was expanded to two nights with four more wrestlers added, when another event scheduled for the Reseda venue was cancelled.

Event

Night One
The Battle of Los Angeles tournament kicked off with a match between Joey Ryan and T.J. Perkins. Perkins delivered a Detonation Kick to Ryan for the win.

Next, Roderick Strong took on Drake Younger. Strong delivered a Gibson Driver to Younger for the win.

Next, Eddie Edwards took on Kyle O'Reilly. Edwards applied an Achilles lock on O'Reilly and stomped his head repeatedly into the match, forcing the referee to stop the match.

Next, B-Boy took on Brian Cage. Cage countered a shining wizard attempt by B-Boy into a Weapon X for the win.

Next, the PWG World Champion Kevin Steen took on Ricochet. Brian Cage interfered in the match to distract Steen. Steen delivered a package piledriver to Cage but Ricochet capitalized on the distraction and delivered a reverse hurricanrana and a 630° senton to Steen for the win.

Next, Willie Mack took on Sami Callihan. Callihan got a near-fall after hitting two lariats to Mack. Callihan then hit a third lariat to Mack for the win.

Next, El Generico took on Adam Cole. Generico hit a Yakuza Kick to Cole but Cole countered by pinning him with a cradle for the win.

It was followed by the final match in the first round between Davey Richards and Michael Elgin. After Richards countered an enzuigiri by Elgin into an ankle lock, Elgin hit a knee lift and then nailed a turnbuckle powerbomb and an Elgin Bomb for the win. Richards congratulated Elgin after the match and told him to win the tournament.

Night Two
Quarterfinals
The quarterfinal round of the Battle of Los Angeles began with a match between Sami Callihan and T.J. Perkins. Callihan countered a Detonation Kick attempt by Perkins by applying a over-the-shoulder single leg Boston crab and make him submit for the win.

Next, Eddie Edwards took on Adam Cole. After a series of superkicks, Cole delivered a Florida Keys to Edwards for the win.

Next, Brian Cage took on Michael Elgin. Cage knocked out the referee while spinning Elgin in the ring allowing Kevin Steen to interfere in the match to avenge Cage's interference which cost Steen, his first round match against Ricochet. Steen delivered a Deep Sea Diverticulitis to Cage but Elgin got a near-fall. After a series of counters, Elgin delivered a powerbomb, a turnbuckle powerbomb and an Elgin Bomb to Cage for the win. Steen attacked Cage after the match until The Young Bucks (Matt Jackson and Nick Jackson) ran in to attack Steen. Referee Rick Knox tried to make the save but Cage attacked him. El Generico then made the save and then Knox challenged Cage and Bucks to a match later in the night with Steen and Generico as his partners. He tried to convince Steen and Generico to put their differences aside but Steen walked out.

It was followed by the next quarterfinal in which Roderick Strong took on Ricochet. Ricochet moved out of a Stronghold by Strong into a hurricanrana and followed it with a shooting star press for the win.

Next, Team Statutory (Davey Richards, Joey Ryan and Kyle O'Reilly) took on the team of B-Boy, Drake Younger and Willie Mack in a six-man tag team match. Mack delivered a Chocolate Thunder Driver to Richards for the win.

Semifinals
The first semifinal match took place between Adam Cole and Sami Callihan. Cole got out of a fireman's carry by Callihan on the top rope and delivered a superkick to Callihan's knee. He followed it with a superkicks to Callihan and then applied a figure four leglock on Callihan to make him submit for the win.

Next, Michael Elgin took on Ricochet. Elgin countered a hurricanrana from the top rope attempt by Ricochet into a superbomb and then followed it with an Elgin Bomb for the win.

It was followed by the penultimate match in which El Generico and referee Rick Knox took on Brian Cage and The Young Bucks. The match originally started as a handicap match until Kevin Steen showed up in the match as Generico and Knox's third partner. Knox delivered a tornado DDT to Matt Jackson. It was followed by a package piledriver by Steen, a brainbuster by Generico and a big splash by Knox for the win.

Final
The Battle of Los Angeles final took place between Michael Elgin and Adam Cole. Cole delivered a Florida Keys to Elgin for the win. Cole refused to acknowledge the "future" nickname assigned to him and said that he was the best wrestler around. He then called out the World Champion Kevin Steen and insulted him, prompting Steen to cut a promo but Cole kicked him in the groin and stole the World Championship belt.

Reception
Jake St-Pierre heavily praised the 2012 Battle of Los Angeles, feeling that it topped "DDT4 as PWG's best tourney of the year" and "the best tournament to happen in wrestling" in any promotion during 2012.

According to him, the night one was "an ultra-consistent show and super easy to sit through" with "amazing stuff top-to-bottom". He specifically praised the match between Davey Richards and Michael Elgin while considering Kevin Steen and Ricochet's contest, "a phenomenal match".

He considered the night two to be "the Show of the Year candidate" and "a totally watchable show with insane variety when it comes to the style of matches you want to see".

Aftermath
After winning the 2012 Battle of Los Angeles, Adam Cole received his title shot for the PWG World Championship against Kevin Steen in a Guerrilla Warfare at the first Mystery Vortex event. Cole defeated Steen to win the title.

Results

Tournament brackets

References

External links
Pro Wrestling Guerrilla official website

2012 in professional wrestling
Battle of Los Angeles (professional wrestling)
Professional wrestling in California
Professional wrestling in Los Angeles
September 2012 sports events in the United States
2012 in Los Angeles
2012 in California